Art Nouveau in Strasbourg developed and was cultivated as a mixture of French influences, especially from the École de Nancy, and Germanic influences, particularly Darmstadt Artists' Colony and Vienna Secession, with some influences of Brussels Art Nouveau added. That synthesis reflected both the position of Strasbourg as a crossroads of European cultures, and the search for a specific identity of the locals, who had been incorporated into the German Empire some 30 years prior, after two centuries of French domination.

Architecture 

Art Nouveau houses (multi-story buildings and villas), department stores, and other public buildings such as a concert hall, and a church, were built in the years 1898–1910 in the Neustadt district, the Neudorf district, the historic city center, and in the Krutenau district. Most of these have survived World War II and the changes of taste, and many are classified as Monuments historiques.

The following Art Nouveau buildings have been classified as Monuments historiques:
Allée de la Robertsau: No. 56, No. 76
Avenue des Vosges: No. 46
Place Broglie: No. 1
Place Sainte-Madeleine: Église Sainte-Madeleine
Rue Erckmann-Chatrian: No. 4
Rue du Faubourg-de-Saverne: No. 15
Rue des Grandes-Arcades: Nos. 33, 35, 37 (former department store)
Rue du Général-de-Castelnau: No. 22
Rue de Phalsbourg: Palais des Fêtes
Rue Sleidan: No. 22
Rue Twinger: No. 24

Fine and decorative arts 

The artists Charles Spindler, Jean-Désiré Ringel d'Illzach, Joseph Sattler, Joseph Ehrismann, Anton Seder were all active in and around Strasbourg in the Art Nouveau period, and shaped many of its local traits. These artists, as well several others who were not drawn to Art Nouveau/Jugendstil (Alfred Marzolff, Léo Schnug, Lothar von Seebach, Gustave Stoskopf...), were members of the Cercle de Saint-Léonard, a francophile circle of painters, playwrights, sculptors, and designers, established in 1897 and strongly attached to redefining and reinventing Alsatian regionalist art. François-Rupert Carabin, born in Saverne and buried in Strasbourg, did not spend the Art Nouveau years in Alsace-Lorraine; nevertheless, due to his having become the director of the École des arts décoratifs de Strasbourg after World War I, the Strasbourg Museum of Modern and Contemporary Art owns a large and representative collection of his works in all domains.

Gallery

References

Bibliography 
Schnitzler, Bernadette (ed.): Strasbourg 1900 – Naissance d’une capitale, Musées de Strasbourg/Somogy Éditions d'art 2000, 
Befort, Paul-André; Daul, Léon; Kontzler, Chantal; Lery, Pierre: Strasbourg 1900 : Carrefour des arts nouveaux, Éditions Place Stanislas 2010, 
Doucet, Hervé; Haegel, Olivier; Pottecher, Marie; et al.: La Neustadt de Strasbourg : un laboratoire urbain (1871-1930), Éditions Lieux Dits 2017,

External links 

Strasbourg on Art Nouveau World